L'Isle-Jourdain (or ) is a commune in the Gers department, Occitania, Southwestern France. The lexicographers Claude (1854–1924) and Paul Augé (1881–1951) were born in L'isle-Jourdain as was the writer Armand Praviel (1875–1944).

Geography

Population
The inhabitants of the commune are known as Lislois in French.

Twin towns
L'Isle-Jourdain is twinned with:
 Carballo, Spain
 Motta di Livenza, Italy

See also
 Save (Garonne)
Communes of the Gers department

References

Communes of Gers
Gers communes articles needing translation from French Wikipedia
Armagnac